Conus dorotheae is a species of sea snail, a marine gastropod mollusc in the family Conidae, the cone snails and their allies.

Like all species within the genus Conus, these snails are predatory and venomous. They are capable of "stinging" humans, therefore live ones should be handled carefully or not at all.

Description
The size of the shell varies between 25 mm and 45 mm.

Distribution
This marine species is found off the Cap-Vert peninsula, Senegal, West Africa.

References

 Monnier E. & Limpalaër L. (2010) Conus dorotheae (Gastropoda, Conidae) A new species of Cone from the Cape Verde Peninsula in Senegal. Visaya 2(6): 73-80
 Puillandre N., Duda T.F., Meyer C., Olivera B.M. & Bouchet P. (2015). One, four or 100 genera? A new classification of the cone snails. Journal of Molluscan Studies. 81: 1–23

External links
 The Conus Biodiversity website
 
 Holotype in MNHN, Paris

dorotheae
Gastropods described in 2010
Molluscs of the Atlantic Ocean
Invertebrates of West Africa